Suicide Estate or Suicide Estate Antibiotic Armageddon is an EP by JK Flesh, a moniker of English musician Justin Broadrick, and was originally released on February 27, 2016 through Hospital Productions as a cassette. Since then, the EP has been rereleased numerous times in different formats, ultimately culminating in a widespread digital release in February 2017, and a double LP in November 2017. Each edition features a different tracklist.

Release history

Originally, Suicide Estate was released on February 27, 2016 as a single 4-track cassette on Dominick Fernow's record label, Hospital Productions. This version was limited to just 44 copies. A double cassette version with new artwork was released on the same record label in April 2016. This version was limited to 66 copies.

On February 20, 2017, nearly a year after the EP's original release, a revised version of the EP known as Suicide Estate Antibiotic Armaggeddon was released digitally through Justin Broadrick's own record label, Avalanche Recordings. This edition was remastered and includes three new or remixed tracks. On November 1, 2017, yet another version of the EP was released again under the title Suicide Estate and again through Hospital Productions. This version came as a double LP, a blue double LP limited to 250 copies, and a CD. This version also features different artwork than the other releases.

Track listing

Personnel
 Justin Broadrick – instruments, production

References

Justin Broadrick albums
Albums produced by Justin Broadrick
2016 EPs
2017 albums